Coongan Station is a pastoral lease that was once a sheep station but now operates as a cattle station in Western Australia. 

The station was established at some time prior to 1896, when it was owned by a Mr. Hardey. The following year the station was owned by the Robinson brothers. The Robinsons, Percy and John, started with a flock of 2,000 sheep.

In 1910, the property supported a flock of 17,500 sheep, which produced 250 bales of wool.

Percy Robinson died in 1943 at the age of 77 years.

See also
List of pastoral leases in Western Australia
List of ranches and stations

References

Pastoral leases in Western Australia
Stations (Australian agriculture)
Homesteads in Western Australia
Pilbara